The American Samoa national junior handball team is the national men's junior handball team of American Samoa.Controlled by the American Samoa Handball Federation it represents American Samoa in international matches.

Oceania Nations Cup record

Competitive record at the Oceania Nations Cup 

Men's national junior handball teams
National sports teams of American Samoa